"Idiota" is the first official single from Spanish band Nena Daconte from their debut Album He Perdido Los Zapatos. It charted at 11 in 2006.

Charts

References

2006 singles
Nena Daconte songs
Songs written by Mai Meneses
2006 songs